Drienčany is a village and municipality in the Rimavská Sobota District of the Banská Bystrica Region of southern Slovakia.

History
In historical records from the Kingdom of Hungary, the village was first mentioned in 1291 (Drenchen) when it was owned by the gens Balog. Later the Hungarian Derencsényi family obtained the lordship. The castle had been built here and it until the end of 17th century. In the 15th century the castle was conquered by John Jiskra. In 16th century Drienčany had been devastated, village became populated in the beginning of 18th century. Inhabitants had been engaged in agriculture, basketry, wax production and livestock breeding.

Genealogical resources

The records for genealogical research are available at the state archive "Statny Archiv in Banska Bystrica, Slovakia"

 Roman Catholic church records (births/marriages/deaths): 1829-1887 (parish B)
 Lutheran church records (births/marriages/deaths): 1698-1895 (parish A)

See also
 List of municipalities and towns in Slovakia

External links
 
 
https://web.archive.org/web/20071116010355/http://www.statistics.sk/mosmis/eng/run.html
http://www.e-obce.sk/obec/driencany/driencany.html
http://www.tourist-channel.sk/driencany/
http://mek.oszk.hu/09500/09536/html/0008/30.html
Surnames of living people in Driencany

Villages and municipalities in Rimavská Sobota District